The Second Italo-Ethiopian War, also referred to as the Second Italo-Abyssinian War, was a war of aggression which was fought between Italy and Ethiopia from October 1935 to February 1937. In Ethiopia it is often referred to simply as the Italian Invasion, and in Italy as the Ethiopian War. It is seen as an example of the expansionist policy that characterized the Axis powers and the ineffectiveness of the League of Nations before the outbreak of the Second World War.

On 3 October 1935, two hundred thousand soldiers of the Italian Army commanded by Marshal Emilio De Bono attacked from Eritrea (then an Italian colonial possession) without prior declaration of war. At the same time a minor force under General Rodolfo Graziani attacked from Italian Somalia. On 6 October, Adwa was conquered, a symbolic place for the Italian army because of the defeat at the Battle of Adwa by the Ethiopian army during the First Italo-Ethiopian War. On 15 October, Italian troops seized Aksum, and an obelisk adorning the city was torn from its site and sent to Rome to be placed symbolically in front of the building of the Ministry of Colonies created by the Fascist regime.

Exasperated by De Bono's slow and cautious progress, Italian Prime Minister Benito Mussolini replaced him with General Pietro Badoglio. Ethiopian forces attacked the newly arrived invading army and launched a counterattack in December 1935, but their poorly armed forces could not resist for long against the modern weapons of the Italians. Even the communications service of the Ethiopian forces depended on foot messengers, as they did not have radio. This was enough for the Italians to impose a narrow fence on Ethiopian detachments to leave them unaware of the movements of their own army. Nazi Germany sent arms and munitions to Ethiopia because it was frustrated over Italian objections to its attempts to integrate Austria. This prolonged the war and sapped Italian resources. It would soon lead to Italy's greater economic dependence on Germany and less interventionist policy on Austria, clearing the path for Hitler's Anschluss.

The Ethiopian counteroffensive managed to stop the Italian advance for a few weeks, but the superiority of the Italians' weapons (particularly heavy artillery and airstrikes with bombs and chemical weapons) prevented the Ethiopians from taking advantage of their initial successes. The Italians resumed the offensive in early March. On 29 March 1936, Graziani bombed the city of Harar and two days later the Italians won a decisive victory in the Battle of Maychew, which nullified any possible organized resistance of the Ethiopians. Emperor Haile Selassie was forced to escape into exile on 2 May, and Badoglio's forces arrived in the capital Addis Ababa on 5 May. Italy announced the annexation of the territory of Ethiopia on 7 May and Italian King Victor Emmanuel III was proclaimed emperor. The provinces of Eritrea, Italian Somaliland and Abyssinia (Ethiopia) were united to form the Italian province of East Africa. Fighting between Italian and Ethiopian troops persisted until 19 February 1937. On the same day, an attempted assassination of Graziani led to the reprisal Yekatit 12 massacre in Addis Ababa, in which between 1,400 and 30,000 civilians were killed. Italian forces continued to suppress rebel activity until 1939.

Italian troops used mustard gas in aerial bombardments (in violation of the Geneva Protocol and Geneva Conventions) against combatants and civilians in an attempt to discourage the Ethiopian people from supporting the resistance. Deliberate Italian attacks against ambulances and hospitals of the Red Cross were reported. By all estimates, hundreds of thousands of Ethiopian civilians died as a result of the Italian invasion, which have been described by some historians as constituting genocide. Crimes by Ethiopian troops included the use of dumdum bullets (in violation of the Hague Conventions), the killing of civilian workmen (including during the Gondrand massacre) and the mutilation of captured Eritrean Ascari and Italians (often with castration), beginning in the first weeks of war.

Background

State of East Africa 

The Kingdom of Italy began its attempts to establish colonies in the Horn of Africa in the 1880s. The first phase of the colonial expansion concluded with the disastrous First Italo-Ethiopian War and the defeat of the Italian forces in the Battle of Adwa, on 1 March 1896, inflicted by the Ethiopian Army of Negus Menelik II, aided by Russia and France. In the following years, Italy abandoned its expansionist plans in the area and limited itself to administering the small possessions that it retained in there: the colony of Italian Eritrea and the protectorate (later colony) of Italian Somalia. For the next few decades, Italian-Ethiopian economic and diplomatic relations remained relatively stable.

On 14 December 1925, Italy's fascist government signed a secret pact with Britain aimed at reinforcing Italian dominance in the region. London recognised that the area was of Italian interest and agreed to the Italian request to build a railway connecting Somalia and Eritrea. Although the signatories had wished to maintain the secrecy of the agreement, the plan soon leaked and caused indignation by the French and Ethiopian governments. The latter denounced it as a betrayal of a country that had been for all intents and purposes a member of the League of Nations.

As fascist rule in Italy continued to radicalise, its colonial governors in the Horn of Africa began pushing outward the margins of their imperial foothold. The governor of Italian Eritrea, Jacopo Gasparini, focused on the exploitation of Teseney and an attempt to win over the leaders of the Tigre people against Ethiopia. The governor of Italian Somaliland, Cesare Maria de Vecchi, began a policy of repression that led to the occupation of the fertile Jubaland, and the cessation in 1928 of collaboration between the settlers and the traditional Somali chiefs.

Welwel Incident 

The Italo-Ethiopian Treaty of 1928 stated that the border between Italian Somaliland and Ethiopia was 21 leagues parallel to the Benadir coast (approximately ). In 1930, Italy built a fort at the Welwel oasis (also Walwal, Italian: Ual-Ual) in the Ogaden and garrisoned it with Somali dubats (irregular frontier troops commanded by Italian officers). The fort at Welwel was well beyond the 21-league limit and inside Ethiopian territory. On 23 November 1934, an Anglo–Ethiopian boundary commission studying grazing grounds to find a definitive border between British Somaliland and Ethiopia arrived at Welwel. The party contained Ethiopian and British technicians and an escort of around 600 Ethiopian soldiers. Both sides knew that the Italians had installed a military post at Welwel and were not surprised to see an Italian flag at the wells. The Ethiopian government had notified the Italian authorities in Italian Somaliland that the commission was active in the Ogaden and requested the Italians to co-operate. When the British commissioner Lieutenant-Colonel Esmond Clifford, asked the Italians for permission to camp nearby, the Italian commander, Captain Roberto Cimmaruta, rebuffed the request.

The Ethiopian commissioners retired with the British, but the escort remained. For ten days both sides exchanged menaces, sometimes no more than 2 m apart. Reinforcements increased the Ethiopian contingent to about 1,500 men and the Italians to about 500, and on 5 December 1934, shots were fired. The Italians were supported by an armoured car and bomber aircraft. The bombs missed, but machine gunfire from the car caused about 110 Ethiopian casualties. Also, 30 to 50 Italians and Somalis were also killed and the incident led to the Abyssinia Crisis at the League of Nations. On 4 September 1935, the League of Nations exonerated both parties for the incident.

Ethiopian isolation 

Britain and France, preferring Italy as an ally against Germany, did not take strong steps to discourage an Italian military buildup on the borders of Italian Eritrea and Italian Somaliland. Because of the German Question, Mussolini needed to deter Hitler from annexing Austria while much of the Italian Army was being deployed to the Horn of Africa, which led him to draw closer to France to provide the necessary deterrent. King Victor Emmanuel III shared the traditional Italian respect for British sea power and insisted to Mussolini that Italy must not antagonise Britain before he assented to the war. In that regard, British diplomacy in the first half of 1935 greatly assisted Mussolini's efforts to win Victor Emmanuel's support for the invasion.

On 7 January 1935, a Franco-Italian Agreement was made that gave Italy essentially a free hand in Africa in return for Italian co-operation in Europe. Pierre Laval told Mussolini that he wanted a Franco-Italian alliance against Nazi Germany and that Italy had a "free hand" in Ethiopia. In April, Italy was further emboldened by participation in the Stresa Front, an agreement to curb further German violations of the Treaty of Versailles. The first draft of the communique at Stresa Summit spoke of upholding stability all over the world, but British Foreign Secretary, Sir John Simon, insisted for the final draft to declare that Britain, France and Italy were committed to upholding stability "in Europe", which Mussolini took for British acceptance of an invasion of Ethiopia. In June, non-interference was further assured by a political rift, which had developed between the United Kingdom and France, because of the Anglo-German Naval Agreement. As 300,000 Italian soldiers were transferred to Eritrea and Italian Somaliland over the spring and the summer of 1935, the world's media was abuzz with speculation that Italy would soon be invading Ethiopia. In June 1935, Anthony Eden arrived in Rome with the message that Britain opposed an invasion and had a compromise plan for Italy to be given a corridor in Ethiopia to link the two Italian colonies in the Horn of Africa, which Mussolini rejected outright. As the Italians had broken the British naval codes, Mussolini knew of the problems in the British Mediterranean Fleet, which led him to believe that the British opposition to the invasion, which had come as an unwelcome surprise to him, was not serious and that Britain would never go to war over Ethiopia.

The prospect that an Italian invasion of Ethiopia would cause a crisis in Anglo-Italian relations was seen as an opportunity in Berlin. Germany provided some weapons to Ethiopia although Hitler did not want to see Haile Selassie win out of fear of quick victory for Italy. The German perspective was that if Italy was bogged down in a long war in Ethiopia, that would probably lead to Britain pushing the League of Nations to impose sanctions on Italy, which the French would almost certainly not veto out of fear of destroying relations with Britain; that would cause a crisis in Anglo-Italian relations and allow Germany to offer its "good services" to Italy. In that way, Hitler hoped to win Mussolini as an ally and to destroy the Stresa Front.

A final possible foreign ally of Ethiopia was Japan, which had served as a model to some Ethiopian intellectuals. After the Welwel incident, several right-wing Japanese groups, including the Great Asianism Association and the Black Dragon Society, attempted to raise money for the Ethiopian cause. The Japanese ambassador to Italy, Dr. Sugimura Yotaro, on 16 July assured Mussolini that Japan held no political interests in Ethiopia and would stay neutral in the coming war. His comments stirred up a furor inside Japan, where there had been popular affinity for the fellow nonwhite empire in Africa, which was reciprocated with similar anger in Italy towards Japan combined with praise for Mussolini and his firm stance against the "gialli di Tokyo" ("Tokyo Yellows"). Despite popular opinion, when the Ethiopians approached Japan for help on 2 August, they were refused, and even a modest request for the Japanese government for an official statement of its support for Ethiopia during the coming conflict was denied.

Armies

Ethiopian forces 

With war appearing inevitable, the Ethiopian Emperor Haile Selassie ordered a general mobilisation of the Army of the Ethiopian Empire:

Selassie's army consisted of around 500,000 men, some of whom were armed with spears and bows. Other soldiers carried more modern weapons including rifles, but many of them were equipment from before 1900 and so were obsolete. According to Italian estimates, on the eve of hostilities, the Ethiopians had an army of 350,000–760,000 men. Only about 25% of the army had any military training, and the men were armed with a motley of 400,000 rifles of every type and in every condition. The Ethiopian Army had about 234 antiquated pieces of artillery mounted on rigid gun carriages as well as a dozen 3.7 cm PaK 35/36 anti-tank guns. The army had about 800 light Colt and Hotchkiss machine-guns and 250 heavy Vickers and Hotchkiss machine guns, about 100 .303-inch Vickers guns on AA mounts, 48 20 mm Oerlikon S anti-aircraft guns and some recently purchased Canon de 75 CA modèle 1917 Schneider  field guns. The arms embargo imposed on the belligerents by France and Britain disproportionately affected Ethiopia, which lacked the manufacturing industry to produce its own weapons. The Ethiopian army had some 300 trucks, seven Ford A-based armoured cars and four World War I era Fiat 3000 tanks.

The best Ethiopian units were the emperor's "Kebur Zabagna" (Imperial Guard), which were well-trained and better equipped than the other Ethiopian troops. The Imperial Guard wore a distinctive greenish-khaki uniform of the Belgian Army, which stood out from the white cotton cloak (shamma), which was worn by most Ethiopian fighters and proved to be an excellent target. The skills of the Rases, the Ethiopian generals armies, were reported to rate from relatively good to incompetent. After Italian objections to the Anschluss, the German annexation of Austria, Germany sent three aeroplanes, 10,000 Mauser rifles and 10 million rounds of ammunition to the Ethiopians.

The serviceable portion of the Ethiopian Air Force was commanded by a Frenchman, André Maillet, and included three obsolete Potez 25 biplanes. A few transport aircraft had been acquired between 1934 and 1935 for ambulance work, but the Air Force had 13 aircraft and four pilots at the outbreak of the war. Airspeed in England had a surplus Viceroy racing plane, and its director, Neville Shute, was delighted with a good offer for the "white elephant" in August 1935. The agent said that it was to fly cinema films around Europe. When the client wanted bomb racks to carry the (flammable) films, Shute agreed to fit lugs under the wings to which they could attach "anything they liked". He was told that the plane was to be used to bomb the Italian oil storage tanks at Massawa, and when the CID enquired about the alien (ex-German) pilot practices in it Shute got the impression that the Foreign Office did not object. However, fuel, bombs and bomb racks from Finland could not be got to Ethiopia in time, and the paid-for Viceroy stayed at its works. The emperor of Ethiopia had £16,000 to spend on modern aircraft to resist the Italians and planned to spend £5000 on the Viceroy and the rest on three Gloster Gladiator fighters.

There were 50 foreign mercenaries who joined the Ethiopian forces, including French pilots like Pierre Corriger, the Trinidadian pilot Hubert Julian, an official Swedish military mission under Captain Viking Tamm, the White Russian Feodor Konovalov and the Czechoslovak writer Adolf Parlesak. Several Austrian Nazis, a team of Belgian fascists and the Cuban mercenary Alejandro del Valle also fought for Haile Selassie. Many of the individuals were military advisers, pilots, doctors or supporters of the Ethiopian cause; 50 mercenaries fought in the Ethiopian army and another 50 people were active in the Ethiopian Red Cross or nonmilitary activities. The Italians later attributed most of the relative success achieved by the Ethiopians to foreigners, or ferenghi. (The Italian propaganda machine magnified the number to thousands to explain away the Ethiopian Christmas Offensive in late 1935.)

Italian forces 

There were 400,000 Italian soldiers in Eritrea and 285,000 in Italian Somaliland with 3,300 machine guns, 275 artillery pieces, 200 tankettes and 205 aircraft. In April 1935, the reinforcement of the Royal Italian Army (Regio Esercito) and the Regia Aeronautica (Royal Air Force) in East Africa (Africa Orientale) accelerated. Eight regular, mountain and blackshirt militia infantry divisions arrived in Eritrea, and four regular infantry divisions arrived in Italian Somaliland, about 685,000 soldiers and a great number of logistical and support units; the Italians included 200 journalists. The Italians had 6,000 machine guns, 2,000 pieces of artillery, 599 tanks and 390 aircraft. The Regia Marina (Royal Navy) carried tons of ammunition, food and other supplies, with the motor vehicles to move them, but the Ethiopians had only horse-drawn carts.

The Italians placed considerable reliance on their Corps of Colonial Troops (Regio Corpo Truppe Coloniali, RCTC) of indigenous regiments recruited from the Italian colonies of Eritrea, Somalia and Libya. The most effective of the Italian commanded units were the Eritrean native infantry (Ascari), which was often used as advanced troops. The Eritreans also provided cavalry and artillery units; the "Falcon Feathers" (Penne di Falco) was one prestigious and colourful Eritrean cavalry unit. Other RCTC units during the invasion of Ethiopia were irregular Somali frontier troops (dubats), regular Arab-Somali infantry and artillery and infantry from Libya. The Italians had a variety of local semi-independent "allies" in the north, and the Azebu Galla were among several groups induced to fight for the Italians. In the south, the Somali Sultan Olol Dinle commanded a personal army, which advanced into the northern Ogaden with the forces of Colonel Luigi Frusci. The Sultan was motivated by his desire to take back lands that the Ethiopians had taken from him. The Italian colonial forces even included men from Yemen, across the Gulf of Aden.

The Italians were reinforced by volunteers from the so-called Italiani all'estero, members of the Italian diaspora from Argentina, Uruguay and Brazil; they formed the 221st Legion in the Divisione Tevere, which a special Legione Parini fought under Frusci near Dire Dawa. On 28 March 1935, General Emilio De Bono was named the commander-in-chief of all Italian armed forces in East Africa. De Bono was also the commander-in-chief of the forces invading from Eritrea on the northern front. De Bono commanded nine divisions in the Italian I Corps, the Italian II Corps and the Eritrean Corps. General Rodolfo Graziani was commander-in-chief of forces invading from Italian Somaliland on the southern front. Initially, he had two divisions and a variety of smaller units under his command: a mixture of Italians, Somalis, Eritreans, Libyans and others. De Bono regarded Italian Somaliland as a secondary theatre, whose primary need was to defend itself, but it could aid the main front with offensive thrusts if the enemy forces were not too large there. Most foreigners accompanied the Ethiopians, but Herbert Matthews, a reporter and historian who wrote Eyewitness in Abyssinia: With Marshal Bodoglio's forces to Addis Ababa (1937), and Pedro del Valle, an observer for US Marine Corps, accompanied the Italian forces.

Hostilities

Italian invasion 

At 5:00 am on 3 October 1935, De Bono crossed the Mareb River and advanced into Ethiopia from Eritrea without a declaration of war. Aircraft of the Regia Aeronautica scattered leaflets asking the population to rebel against Haile Selassie and support the "true Emperor Iyasu V". Forty-year-old Iyasu had been deposed many years earlier but was still in custody. In response to the Italian invasion, Ethiopia declared war on Italy. At this point in the campaign, the lack of roads represented a serious hindrance for the Italians as they crossed into Ethiopia. On the Eritrean side, roads had been constructed right up to the border. On the Ethiopian side, these roads often transitioned into vaguely defined paths, and the Italian army used aerial photography to plan its advance, as well as mustard gas attacks. On 5 October the Italian I Corps took Adigrat, and by 6 October, Adwa (Adowa) was captured by the Italian II Corps. Haile Selassie had ordered Duke (Ras) Seyoum Mangasha, the Commander of the Ethiopian Army of Tigre, to withdraw a day's march away from the Mareb River. Later, the Emperor ordered his son-in-law and Commander of the Gate (Dejazmach) Haile Selassie Gugsa, also in the area, to move back  from the border.

On 11 October, Gugsa surrendered with 1,200 followers at the Italian outpost at Adagamos; Italian propagandists lavishly publicised the surrender but fewer than a tenth of Gugsa's men defected with him. On 14 October, De Bono proclaimed the end of slavery in Ethiopia but this liberated the former slave owners from the obligation to feed their former slaves, in the unsettled conditions caused by the war. Much of the livestock in the area had been moved to the south to feed the Ethiopian army and many of the emancipated people had no choice but to appeal to the Italian authorities for food. By 15 October, De Bono's forces had advanced from Adwa and occupied the holy capital of Axum. De Bono entered the city riding on a white horse and then looted the Obelisk of Axum. To Mussolini's dismay, the advance was methodical and on 8 November, the I Corps and the Eritrean Corps captured Makale. The Italian advance had added  to the line of supply and De Bono wanted to build a road from Adigrat before continuing. On 16 November, De Bono was promoted to the rank of Marshal of Italy (Maresciallo d'Italia) and in December was replaced by Badoglio to speed up the invasion.

Hoare–Laval Pact 

On 14 November 1935, the National government in Britain, led by Prime Minister Stanley Baldwin, won a general election on a platform of upholding collective security and support for the League of Nations, which at least implied that Britain would support Ethiopia. However, the British service chiefs, led by the First Sea Lord, Admiral Sir Earle Chatfield, all advised against going to war with Italy for the sake of Ethiopia, which carried much weight with the cabinet. During the 1935 election, Baldwin and the rest of the cabinet had repeatedly promised that Britain was committed to upholding collective security in the belief of that being the best way to neutralise the Labour Party, which also ran on a platform emphasising collective security and support for the League of Nations. To square the circle caused by its election promises and its desire to avoid offending Mussolini too much, the cabinet decided upon a plan to give most of Ethiopia to Italy, with the rest in the Italian sphere of influence, as the best way of ending the war.

In early December 1935, the Hoare–Laval Pact was proposed by Britain and France. Italy would gain the best parts of Ogaden and Tigray and economic influence over all the south. Abyssinia would have a guaranteed corridor to the sea at the port of Assab; the corridor was a poor one and known as a "corridor for camels". Mussolini was ready to play along with considering the Hoare-Laval Pact, rather than rejecting it outright, to avoid a complete break with Britain and France, but he kept demanding changes to the plan before he would accept it as a way to stall for more time to allow his army to conquer Ethiopia. Mussolini was not prepared to abandon the goal of conquering Ethiopia, but the imposition of League of Nations sanctions on Italy caused much alarm in Rome. The war was wildly popular with the Italian people, who relished Mussolini's defiance of the League as an example of Italian greatness. Even if Mussolini had been willing to stop the war, the move would have been very unpopular in Italy. Kallis wrote, "Especially after the imposition of sanctions in November 1935, the popularity of the Fascist regime reached unprecedented heights". On 13 December, details of the pact were leaked by a French newspaper and denounced as a sellout of the Ethiopians. The British government disassociated itself from the pact and British Foreign Secretary Sir Samuel Hoare was forced to resign in disgrace.

Ethiopian Christmas Offensive 

The Christmas Offensive was intended to split the Italian forces in the north with the Ethiopian centre, crushing the Italian left with the Ethiopian right and to invade Eritrea with the Ethiopian left. Ras Seyum Mangasha held the area around Abiy Addi with about 30,000 men. Selassie with about 40,000 men advanced from Gojjam toward Mai Timket to the left of Ras Seyoum. Ras Kassa Haile Darge with around 40,000 men advanced from Dessie to support Ras Seyoum in the centre in a push towards Warieu Pass. Ras Mulugeta Yeggazu, the Minister of War, advanced from Dessie with approximately 80,000 men to take positions on and around Amba Aradam to the right of Ras Seyoum. Amba Aradam was a steep sided, flat topped mountain directly in the way of an Italian advance on Addis Ababa. The four commanders had approximately 190,000 men facing the Italians. Ras Imru and his Army of Shire were on the Ethiopian left. Ras Seyoum and his Army of Tigre and Ras Kassa and his Army of Beghemder were the Ethiopian centre. Ras Mulugeta and his "Army of the Center" (Mahel Sefari) were on the Ethiopian right.

A force of 1,000 Ethiopians crossed the Tekeze river and advanced toward the Dembeguina Pass (Inda Aba Guna or Indabaguna pass). The Italian commander, Major Criniti, commanded a force of 1,000 Eritrean infantry supported by L3 tanks. When the Ethiopians attacked, the Italian force fell back to the pass, only to discover that 2,000 Ethiopian soldiers were already there and Criniti's force was encircled. In the first Ethiopian attack, two Italian officers were killed and Criniti was wounded. The Italians tried to break out using their L3 tanks but the rough terrain immobilised the vehicles. The Ethiopians killed the infantry, then rushed the tanks and killed their two-man crews. Italian forces organised a relief column made up of tanks and infantry to relieve Critini but it was ambushed en route. Ethiopians on the high ground rolled boulders in front of and behind several of the tanks, to immobilise them, picked off the Eritrean infantry and swarmed the tanks. The other tanks were immobilised by the terrain, unable to advance further and two were set on fire. Critini managed to break-out in a bayonet charge and half escaped; Italian casualties were 31 Italians and 370 Askari killed and five Italians taken prisoner; Ethiopian casualties were estimated by the Italians to be 500, which was probably greatly exaggerated.

The news from the "northern front" was generally bad for Italy. However, foreign correspondents in Addis Ababa publicly took up knitting to mock their lack of access to the front. There was no way for them to verify reports that 4,700 Italians had been captured. The correspondents were told by the Ethiopians that Italian tanks had been stranded and abandoned and that Italian native troops were mutinying. Later, a report was issued that Ethiopian warriors had captured eighteen tanks, thirty-three field guns, 175 machine guns, and 2,605 rifles. In addition, this report indicated that the Ethiopians had wiped out an entire legion of the 2nd CC.NN. Division "28 Ottobre" and that the Italians had lost at least 3,000 men. Rome denied these figures.

The ambitious Ethiopian plan called for Ras Kassa and Ras Seyoum to split the Italian army in two and isolate the Italian I Corps and III Corps in Mekele. Ras Mulugeta would then descend from Amba Aradam and crush both corps. According to this plan, after Ras Imru retook Adwa, he was to invade Eritrea. In November, the League of Nations condemned Italy's aggression and imposed economic sanctions. This excluded oil, however, an indispensable raw material for the conduct of any modern military campaign, and this favoured Italy.

The Ethiopian counteroffensive managed to stop the Italian advance for a few weeks, but the superiority of the Italian's weaponry (artillery and machine guns) as well as aerial bombardment with chemical weapons, at first with mustard gas prevented the Ethiopians from taking advantage of their initial successes. The Ethiopians in general were very poorly armed, with few machine guns, their troops mainly armed with swords and spears. Having spent a decade accumulating poison gas in East Africa, Mussolini gave Badoglio authority to resort to Schrecklichkeit (frightfulness), which included destroying villages and using gas (OC 23/06, 28 December 1935); Mussolini was even prepared to resort to bacteriological warfare as long as these methods could be kept quiet. Some Italians objected when they found out but the practices were kept secret, the government issuing denials or spurious stories blaming the Ethiopians.

Second Italian advance 

As the progress of the Christmas Offensive slowed, Italian plans to renew the advance on the northern front began as Mussolini had given permission to use poison gas (but not mustard gas) and Badoglio received the Italian III Corps and the Italian IV Corps in Eritrea during early 1936. On 20 January, the Italians resumed their northern offensive at the First Battle of Tembien (20 to 24 January) in the broken terrain between the Warieu Pass and Makale. The forces of Ras Kassa were defeated, the Italians using phosgene gas and suffering 1,082 casualties against 8,000 Ethiopian casualties according to an Ethiopian wireless message intercepted by the Italians.

From 10 to 19 February, the Italians captured Amba Aradam and destroyed Ras Mulugeta's army in the Battle of Amba Aradam (Battle of Enderta). The Ethiopians suffered massive losses and poison gas destroyed a small part of Ras Mulugeta's army, according to the Ethiopians. During the slaughter following the attempted withdrawal of his army, both Ras Mulugeta and his son were killed. The Italians lost 800 killed and wounded while the Ethiopians lost 6,000 killed and 12,000 wounded. From 27 to 29 February, the armies of Ras Kassa and Ras Seyoum were destroyed at the Second Battle of Tembien. Ethiopians again argued that poison gas played a role in the destruction of the withdrawing armies. In early March, the army of Ras Imru was attacked, bombed and defeated in what was known as the Battle of Shire. In the battles of Amba Aradam, Tembien and Shire, the Italians suffered about 2,600 casualties and the Ethiopians about 15,000; Italian casualties at the Battle of Shire being 969 men. The Italian victories stripped the Ethiopian defences on the northern front, Tigré province had fallen most of the Ethiopian survivors returned home or took refuge in the countryside and only the army guarding Addis Ababa stood between the Italians and the rest of the country.

On 31 March 1936 at the Battle of Maychew, the Italians defeated an Ethiopian counter-offensive by the main Ethiopian army commanded by Selassie. The Ethiopians launched near non-stop attacks on the Italian and Eritrean defenders but could not overcome the well-prepared Italian defences. When the exhausted Ethiopians withdrew, the Italians counter-attacked. The Regia Aeronautica attacked the survivors at Lake Ashangi with mustard gas. The Italian troops had 400 casualties, the Eritreans 874 and the Ethiopians suffered 8,900 casualties from 31,000 men present according to an Italian estimate. On 4 April, Selassie looked with despair upon the horrific sight of the dead bodies of his army ringing the poisoned lake. Following the battle, Ethiopian soldiers began to employ guerrilla tactics against the Italians, initiating a trend of resistance that would transform into the Patriot/Arbegnoch movement. They were joined by local residents who operated independently near their own homes. Early activities included capturing war materials, rolling boulders off cliffs at passing convoys, kidnapping messengers, cutting telephone lines, setting fire to administrative offices and fuel and ammunition dumps, and killing collaborators. As disruption increased, the Italians were forced to redeploy more troops to Tigre, away from the campaign further south.

Southern front 

On 3 October 1935, Graziani implemented the Milan Plan to remove Ethiopian forces from various frontier posts and to test the reaction to a series of probes all along the southern front. While incessant rains worked to hinder the plan, within three weeks the Somali villages of Kelafo, Dagnerai, Gerlogubi and Gorahai in Ogaden were in Italian hands. Late in the year,  Ras Desta Damtu assembled up his army in the area around Negele Borana, to advance on Dolo and invade Italian Somaliland. Between 12 and 16 January 1936, the Italians defeated the Ethiopians at the Battle of Genale Doria. The Regia Aeronautica destroyed the army of Ras Desta, Ethiopians claiming that poison gas was used.

After a lull in February 1936, the Italians in the south prepared an advance towards the city of Harar. On 22 March, the Regia Aeronautica bombed Harar and Jijiga, reducing them to ruins even though Harar had been declared an "open city". On 14 April, Graziani launched his attack against Ras Nasibu Emmanual to defeat the last Ethiopian army in the field at the Battle of the Ogaden. The Ethiopians were drawn up behind a defensive line that was termed the "Hindenburg Wall", designed by the chief of staff of Ras Nasibu, and Wehib Pasha, a seasoned ex-Ottoman commander. After ten days, the last Ethiopian army had disintegrated; 2,000 Italian soldiers and 5,000 Ethiopian soldiers were killed or wounded.

Fall of Addis Ababa 

On 26 April 1936, Badoglio began the "March of the Iron Will" from Dessie to Addis Ababa, an advance with a mechanised column against slight Ethiopian resistance. The column experienced a more serious attack on 4 May when Ethiopian forces under Haile Mariam Mammo ambushed the formation in Chacha, near Debre Berhan, killing approximately 170 colonial troops.

Meanwhile, Selassie conducted a disorganized retreat towards the capital. There, government officials operated without leadership, unable to contact the Emperor and unsure of his whereabouts. Realizing that Addis Ababa would soon fall to the Italians, Ethiopian administrators met to discuss a possible evacuation of the government to the west. After several days, they decided that they should relocate to Gore, though actual preparations for their departure were postponed. Addis Ababa became crowded with retreating soldiers from the front while its foreign residents sought refuge at various European legations. Selassie reached the capital on 30 April. That day his Council of Ministers resolved that the city should be defended and a retreat to Gore conducted only as a last resort. The following day an ad hoc council of Ethiopian nobles convened to re-examine the decision, where Ras Aberra Kassa suggested that the Emperor should go to Geneva to appeal to the League of Nations for assistance before returning to lead resistance against the Italians. The view was subsequently adopted by Selassie and preparations were made for his departure. On 2 May, Selassie boarded a train from Addis Ababa to Djibouti, with the gold of the Ethiopian Central Bank. From there he fled to the United Kingdom, with the tacit acquiescence of the Italians who could have bombed his train, into exile (Mussolini had refused a request from Graziani to mount such an attack.)

Before he departed, Selassie ordered that the government of Ethiopia be moved to Gore and directed the mayor of Addis Ababa to maintain order in the city until the Italians' arrival. Imru Haile Selassie was appointed Prince Regent during his absence. The city police, under Abebe Aregai and the remainder of the Imperial Guard did their utmost to restrain a growing crowd but rioters rampaged throughout the city, looting and setting fire to shops owned by Europeans. Most of the violence occurred between looters, fighting over the spoils and by 5 May, much of the city lay in ruins. At 04:00 Badoglio drove into the city at the head of 1,600 lorries and patrols of Italian tanks, troops and Carabinieri were sent to occupy tactically valuable areas in the city, as the remaining inhabitants watched sullenly.

Subsequent operations 

After the occupation of Addis Ababa, nearly half of Ethiopia was still unoccupied and the fighting continued for another three years until nearly 90% was "pacified" just before World War II, although censorship kept this from the Italian public. Ethiopian commanders withdrew to nearby areas to regroup; Abebe Aregai went to Ankober, Balcha Safo to Gurage, Zewdu Asfaw to Mulo, Blatta Takale Wolde Hawariat to Limmu and the Kassa brothers—Aberra, Wondosson and Asfawossen—to Selale. Haile Mariam conducted hit-and-run attacks around the capital. About 10,000 troops remaining under the command of Aberra Kassa had orders from Selassie to continue resistance. On 10 May 1936, Italian troops from the northern front and from the southern front met at Dire Dawa. The Italians found the recently released Ethiopian Ras, Hailu Tekle Haymanot, who boarded a train back to Addis Ababa and approached the Italian invaders in submission. Imru Haile Selassie fell back to Gore in southern Ethiopia to reorganise and continue to resist the Italians. In early June, the Italian government promulgated a constitution for Africa Orientale Italiana (AOI, Italian East Africa) bringing Ethiopia, Eritrea and Italian Somaliland together into an administrative unit of six provinces. Badoglio became the first Viceroy and Governor General but on 11 June, he was replaced by Marshal Graziani.

Plans were made to storm parts of the capital but a lack of transport and radio equipment prevented a co-ordinated attack. In July, Ethiopian forces attacked Addis Ababa and were routed. Numerous members of Ethiopian royalty were taken prisoner and others were executed soon after they surrendered. The exiled government in Gore was never able to provide any meaningful leadership to the Patriots or remaining military formations but sporadic resistance by independent groups persisted around the capital.

On the night 26 June, members of the Black Lions organization destroyed three Italian aircraft in Nekemte and killed twelve Italian officials, including Air Marshal Vincenzo Magliocco after the Italians had sent the party to parley with the local populace. Graziani ordered the town to be bombed in retaliation for the killings (Magliocco was his deputy). Local hostility forced out the Patriots and Desta Damtew, commander of the southern Patriots, withdrew his troops to Arbegona. Surrounded by Italian forces, they retreated to Butajira, where they were eventually defeated. An estimated 4,000 Patriots were reportedly killed in both engagements, 1,600 of whom—including Damtew—after being taken prisoner. On 19 December, Wondosson Kassa was executed near Debre Zebit and on 21 December, Aberra Kassa and Asfawossen Kassa were executed in Fikke. In late 1936, after the Italians tracked him down in Gurage, Dejazmach Balcha Safo was killed in battle. On 19 December, Selassie surrendered at the Gojeb river.

After the end of the rainy season, an Italian column left Addis Ababa in September and occupied Gore a month later. The forces of Ras Imru were trapped between the Italians and the Sudan border and Imru surrendered on 17 December. Imru was flown to Italy and imprisoned on the Island of Ponza, while the rest of the Ethiopian prisoners taken in the war were dispersed in camps in East Africa and Italy. A second column went south-west to attack Ras Desta and the Dejasmatch Gabre Mariam who had assembled military forces in the Great Lakes district. The Ethiopians were defeated on 16 December and by January, the Italians had established a measure of control over the provinces of Jimma, Kafa and Arusi. After another two months, the remaining Ethiopians were surrounded and fought on, rather than surrender. Mariam was killed. On 19 February 1937 the last battle of the war occurred when remnants of the Armies of Sidamo and Bale clashed with Italian forces at Gogetti, and were defeated.

Addis Ababa massacre 

That same date, 19 February 1937 – Yekatit 12 according to the Ge'ez calendar – saw the attempted assassination of Marshal Graziani by Eritrean rebels Abraham Deboch and Mogos Asgedom in Addis Ababa. The campaign of reprisals visited by the Italians upon the population of Addis Ababa has been described as the worst massacre in Ethiopian history. Estimates vary on the number of people killed in the three days that followed the attempt on Graziani's life. Ethiopian sources estimated that 30,000 people were killed by the Italians, while Italian sources claimed that only a few hundred were killed. A 2017 history of the massacre estimated that 19,200 people were killed, 20 percent of the population of Addis Ababa. Over the following week, numerous Ethiopians suspected of opposing Italian rule were rounded up and executed, including members of the Black Lions and other members of the aristocracy. Many more were imprisoned, even collaborators such as Ras Gebre Haywot, the son of Ras Mikael of Wollo, Brehane Markos, and Ayale Gebre, who had helped the Italians identify the two men who made the attempt on Graziani's life.

According to Mockler, "Italian carabinieri had fired into the crowds of beggars and poor assembled for the distribution of alms; and it is said that the Federal Secretary, Guido Cortese, even fired his revolver into the group of Ethiopian dignitaries standing around him." Hours later, Cortese gave the fatal order:Comrades, today is the day when we should show our devotion to our Viceroy by reacting and destroying the Ethiopians for three days. For three days I give you ''carte blanche'' to destroy and kill and do what you want to the Ethiopians. Italians doused native houses with petrol and set them on fire. They broke into the homes of local Greeks and Armenians and lynched their servants. Some even posed on the corpses of their victims to have their photographs taken. The first day of the massacre has been commemorated as "Yekatit 12" (Ethiopian 19 February) by Ethiopians ever since. There is a Yekatit 12 monument in Addis Ababa in memory of these Ethiopian victims of Italian aggression.

Aftermath

Casualties 

In 1968, Colonel A. J. Barker wrote that from 1 January 1935 to 31 May 1936, the Italian army and Blackshirt units lost  killed,  died of wounds and thirty-one missing; about  troops and  workmen were also killed, a total of  In a 1978 publication, Alberto Sbacchi wrote that these official Italian casualty figures of about  an underestimate. Sbacchi wrote that the official total of Italian casualties was unreliable, because the regime desired to underestimate Italian losses. Del Boca estimates the total Italian losses up to 31 December 1936 (including more than six months of guerrilla warfare after the end of the conflict) speak of 2,317 dead for the Italian army, 1,165 for the Blackshirts, 193 from the air force, 56 from the navy, 78 civilians in the Gondrand shipyard massacre, 453 factory workers and 88 merchant marines, for a total of 4,350 Italians killed. To these figures must be added approximately 9,000 injured and 18,200 repatriated due to illness. Estimates on the losses of the askaris, however very vague, he puts it at 4,500 killed. Total Italian casualties from 1935 to 1940 according to these calculations were about 208,000 killed or wounded. Based on  killed in the first six months of 1940, Ministry of Africa figures for 6 May 1936 to 10 June 1940 are  killed, which Sbacchi considered to be fairly accurate. 

There was a lack of reliable statistics because confusion during the invasion made it difficult to keep accurate records and the Statistical Bulletin had ceased to provide data on fatalities. Field hospital records had been destroyed, inventories dispersed, individual deaths were not reported and bodies were not repatriated to Italy. Conversely, in a memorandum submitted to the Paris conference in 1946, the Ethiopian government enumerated  killed in action,  killed in hostilities during the occupation from 1936 to 1941,  and children killed by bombing,  killed in the massacre of February 1937,  died in concentration camps,  killed in obedience to orders from summary courts,  died after their villages had been destroyed, a total of  However, Del Boca claims that these figures are unreliable and were likely exaggerated to extract more reparations. He asserts that the Italian estimation is more accurate.

Public and international reaction 

Italy's military victory overshadowed concerns about the economy. Mussolini was at the height of his popularity in May 1936 with the proclamation of the Italian empire. His biographer, Renzo De Felice, called the war "Mussolini's masterpiece" as for a brief moment he had been able to create something resembling a national consensus both in favor of himself and his regime. When Badoglio returned to Italy, he received a snub as Mussolini made certain the honours he received fell short of those granted to an Italian "national hero" in order to present the victory as an achievement of the Fascist system rather an achievement of the traditional Italian elites of which Badoglio was a member. A sign of Mussolini's increased power and popularity after the war was his creation of a new military rank; First Marshal of the Italian Empire, which he promoted both himself and King Victor Emmanuel III to, thus putting the prime minister on a theoretical level of equality with the king.

Haile Selassie sailed from Djibouti in the British cruiser . From Mandatory Palestine Selassie sailed to Gibraltar en route to Britain. While still in Jerusalem, Haile Selassie sent a telegram to the League of Nations:

The Ethiopian Emperor's telegram caused several nations to temporarily defer recognition of the Italian conquest.

On 30 June, Selassie spoke at the League of Nations and was introduced by the President of the Assembly as "His Imperial Majesty, the Emperor of Ethiopia" ("Sa Majesté Imperiale, l'Empereur d'Ethiopie"). A group of jeering Italian journalists began yelling insults and were expelled before he could speak. In response, the Romanian chairman, Nicolae Titulescu, jumped to his feet and shouted "Show the savages the door!" ("À la porte les sauvages!"). Selassie denounced Italian aggression and criticised the world community for standing by. At the conclusion of his speech, which appeared on newsreels throughout the world, he said "It is us today. It will be you tomorrow". France appeased Italy because it could not afford to risk an alliance between Italy and Germany; Britain decided its military weakness meant that it had to follow France's lead. Selassie's resolution to the League to deny recognition of the Italian conquest was defeated and he was denied a loan to finance a resistance movement. On 4 July 1936, the League voted to end the sanctions imposed against Italy in November 1935 and by 15 July, the sanctions were at an end.

On 18 November 1936, the Italian Empire was recognised by the Empire of Japan and Italy recognised the Japanese occupation of Manchuria, marking the end of the Stresa Front. Hitler had supplied the Ethiopians with 16,000 rifles and 600 machine guns in the hope that Italy would be weakened when he moved against Austria. By contrast, France and Britain recognised Italian control over Ethiopia in 1938. Mexico was the only country to strongly condemn Italy's sovereignty over Ethiopia, respecting Ethiopian independence throughout. Including Mexico, only six nations in 1937 did not recognise the Italian occupation: China, New Zealand, the Soviet Union, Republican Spain and the United States. Three years later, only the USSR officially recognised Selassie and the United States government considered recognising the Italian Empire with Ethiopia included. The invasion of Ethiopia and its general condemnation by Western democracies isolated Mussolini and Fascist Italy until 1938. From 1936 to 1939, Mussolini and Hitler joined forces to support the fascist camp during the Spanish Civil War. In April 1939, Mussolini launched the Italian invasion of Albania. In May, Italy and Nazi Germany joined in the Pact of Steel. In September 1940, both nations signed the Tripartite Pact along with the Empire of Japan.

War crimes 

Italian military forces used between 300 and 500 tons of mustard gas to attack both military and civilian targets, despite being a signatory to the 1925 Geneva Protocol banning the practice. This gas had been produced during World War I and subsequently transported to East Africa. J. F. C. Fuller, who was present in Ethiopia during the conflict, stated that mustard gas "was the decisive tactical factor in the war." Some historians estimate that up to one-third of Ethiopian casualties of the war were caused by chemical weapons.

The Italians claimed that their use of gas was justified by the execution of Tito Minniti and his observer in Ogaden by Ethiopian forces. However, the use of gas was authorized by Mussolini nearly two months before Minniti's death on 26 December 1935, as evinced by the following order:

After Minniti's death, the order was expanded to use of gas "on a vast scale":

Military and civilian targets were gas bombed and on 30 December, a Red Cross unit was bombed at Dolo and an Egyptian ambulance was attacked at Bulale; a few days later an Egyptian medical unit was bombed at Daggah Bur. There were more attacks in January and February, then on 4 March 1936, a British Red Cross camp near Quoram appeared to be subject to the most deliberate attack of all, when low-flying Italian aircraft crews could not have missed the big Red Cross signs. Mustard gas was also sprayed from above on Ethiopian combatants and villages. The Italians tried to keep their resort to chemical warfare secret but were exposed by the International Red Cross and many foreign observers. The Italians claimed that at least 19 bombardments of Red Cross tents "posted in the areas of military encampment of the Ethiopian resistance", had been "erroneous".

The Italians delivered poison gas by gas shell and in bombs dropped by the Regia Aeronautica. Though poorly equipped, the Ethiopians had achieved some success against modern weaponry but had no defence against the "terrible rain that burned and killed". Anthony Mockler wrote that the effect of mustard gas in battle was negligible, and in 1959, D. K. Clark wrote that the US Major, Norman Fiske,

Italians, like the war correspondent Indro Montanelli, noted that the Italian soldiers had no gas masks, that there was no use of gas or it was used in very small amounts if at all.

These claims are disputed by Captain Meade, the US observer with Ethiopian forces who wrote:

Major General J. F. C. Fuller, assigned to the Italian army, concluded:

US military analysis concluded:

Haile Selassie in his report to the League of Nations described it:

Historian Angelo Del Boca condemned the use of gas, but argued that it had only a minimal effect on Italian war aims.

Ethiopian troops used Dum-Dum bullets, which had been banned by declaration IV, 3 of the Hague Convention (1899) and began mutilating captured Eritrean Askari (often with castration) beginning in the first weeks of war. Some hundreds of colonial Eritrean Ascari and dozens of Italians suffered these amputations, often done before death as allegedly happened to 17 Italian workers emasculated in Gondrand in February 1936.

Italian occupation

1936–1940 

On 10 May 1936, Italian troops from the northern front and from the southern front met at Dire Dawa. The Italians found the recently released Ethiopian Ras, Hailu Tekle Haymanot, who boarded a train back to Addis Ababa and approached the Italian invaders in submission. On 21 December 1937, Rome appointed Amedeo, 3rd Duke of Aosta, as the new Viceroy and Governor General of Italian East Africa with instructions to take a more conciliatory line. Aosta instituted public works projects including  of new paved roadways, 25 hospitals, 14 hotels, dozens of post offices, telephone exchanges, aqueducts, schools and shops. The Italians decreed miscegenation to be illegal. Racial separation, including residential segregation, was enforced as thoroughly as possible and the Italians showed favouritism to non-Christian groups. To isolate the dominant Amhara rulers of Ethiopia, who supported Selassie, the Italians granted the Oromos, the Somalis and other Muslims, many of whom had supported the invasion, autonomy and rights. The Italians also definitively abolished slavery and abrogated feudal laws that had been upheld by the Amharas. Early in 1938, a revolt broke out in Gojjam, led by the Committee of Unity and Collaboration, made up of some of the young, educated elite who had escaped reprisals after the assassination attempt on Graziani. The general oversaw another wave of reprisals and had all Ethiopians in administrative jobs murdered, some by being thrown from aircraft, after being taken on board under the pretext of visiting the King in Rome, leading to the saying "He went to Rome".

The army of occupation had 150,000 men but was spread thinly; by 1941 the garrison had been increased to 250,000 soldiers, including 75,000 Italian civilians. The former police chief of Addis Ababa, Abebe Aregai, was the most successful leader of the Ethiopian guerrilla movement after 1937, using units of fifty men. On 11 December, the League of Nations voted to condemn Italy and Mussolini withdrew from the League. Along with world condemnation, the occupation was expensive, the budget for AOI from 1936 to 1937 required 19,136 billion lire for infrastructure, when the annual revenue of Italy was only 18,581 billion lire. In 1939 Ras Seyoum Mengesha, Ras Getachew Abate and Ras Kebede Guebret submitted to the Italian Empire and guerilla warfare petered out. In early 1940, the last area of guerilla activity was around Lake Tana and the southern Gojjam, under the leadership of the degiac Mengesha Gembere and Belay Zeleke.

East African campaign, 1940–1941 

While in exile in United Kingdom, Haile Selassie had sought the support of the Western democracies for his cause but had little success until the Second World War began. On 10 June 1940, Mussolini declared war on France and Britain and attacked British and Commonwealth forces in Egypt, Sudan, Kenya and British Somaliland. In August 1940, the Italian conquest of British Somaliland was completed. The British and Selassie incited Ethiopian and other local forces to join a campaign to dislodge the Italians from Ethiopia. Selassie went to Khartoum to establish closer liaison with the British and resistance forces within Ethiopia. On 18 January 1941, Selassie crossed the border into Ethiopia near the village of Um Iddla and two days later rendezvoused with Gideon Force. On 5 May, Selassie and an army of Ethiopian Free Forces entered Addis Ababa. After the Italian defeat, the Italian guerrilla war in Ethiopia was carried out by remnants of Italian troops and their allies, which lasted until the Armistice between Italy and Allied armed forces in September 1943.

Peace treaty, 1947 

The treaty signed in Paris by the Italian Republic (Repubblica Italiana) and the victorious powers of World War II on 10 February 1947, included formal Italian recognition of Ethiopian independence and an agreement to pay $25,000,000 in reparations. Since the League of Nations and most of its members had never officially recognized Italian sovereignty over Ethiopia, Haile Selassie had been recognized as the restored emperor of Ethiopia following his formal entry into Addis Ababa in May 1941. Ethiopia presented a bill to the Economic Commission for Italy of £184,746,023 for damages inflicted during the course of the Italian occupation.

See also 

 List of Second Italo-Ethiopian War weapons of Ethiopia
 Ethiopian Air Force
 List of Second Italo-Ethiopian War weapons of Italy
 Censorship in Italy
 Faccetta Nera
 First Italo-Ethiopian War
 Paris Peace Treaties, 1947
 Timeline of the Second Italo-Ethiopian War

Notes

References

Sources

Books

Journals

Further reading

Books

Theses

External links 

 Speech to the League of Nations, June 1936  (full text)
 British newsreel footage of Haile Selassie's address to the League of Nations
 Regio Esercito: La Campagna d'Etiopia
 Ethiopia 1935–36: mustard gas and attacks on the Red Cross (Full version in French) – Bernard Bridel, Le Temps
 The use of chemical weapons in the 1935–36 Italo-Ethiopian War – SIPRI Arms Control and Non-proliferation Programme, October 2009
 Mussolini's Invasion and the Italian Occupation
 Mussolini's Ethiopia Campaign
 OnWar: Second Italo–Abyssinian War 1935–1936
 The Day the Angel Cried
 The Emperor Leaves Ethiopia
 Ascari: I Leoni di Eritrea/Ascari: The Lions of Eritrea. Second Italo-Abyssinian war. Eritrea colonial history, Eritrean ascari pictures/photos galleries and videos, historical atlas...
 Ross, F. 1937. The Strategical Conduct of the Campaign and supply and Evacuation Programmes 
  
 Songs of 2nd Italo-Abyssinian War

 
1935 in Ethiopia
1935 in Italy
1936 in Ethiopia
1936 in Italy
Conflicts in 1935
Conflicts in 1936
Italo-Ethiopian War, Second
Haile Selassie
Italo-Ethiopian War, Second
Italo-Ethiopian War, Second
Italo-Ethiopian War, Second
 
Italo-Ethiopian War, Second
Italo-Ethiopian War, Second
African resistance to colonialism
Interwar period